The following is a list of notable events and releases of the year 1906 in Norwegian music.

Events

Deaths

Births

 February
 3 – Ludvig Nielsen, composer and organist (died 2001).

 July
 19 – Klaus Egge, composer and music critic (died 1979).

See also
 1906 in Norway
 Music of Norway

References

 
Norwegian music
Norwegian
Music
1900s in Norwegian music